Ikalto may refer to:

Ikalto Monastery
Academy of Ikalto